Hav Plenty (Music From the Motion Picture) is the soundtrack to Christopher Scott Cherot's 1997 romantic comedy film Hav Plenty. It was released on June 9, 1998 through Yab Yum Records/550 Music/Sony Music Soundtrax and consisted of mainly contemporary R&B with some hip hop music. The soundtrack peaked at 39 on the Billboard 200 and 6 on the Top R&B/Hip-Hop Albums.

Track listing

References

External links 
 
 

1998 soundtrack albums
Albums produced by Babyface (musician)
Albums produced by D-Dot
Albums produced by Rashad Smith
Albums produced by Teddy Riley
Albums produced by Warryn Campbell
Comedy film soundtracks
Contemporary R&B soundtracks
Hip hop soundtracks